Ronald Reagan Parkway and Ameriplex Parkway is a parkway-type road named in part after former U.S. President Ronald Reagan. The road was commissioned in the 1990s, and the initial  section from U.S. Highway 36 to County Road 100 N (CR 100 N) was completed in 1996. It was later extended to CR 200 N. The segment from CR 200 N to CR 300 N opened in early 2015. Construction on the section from CR 300 N to the existing road connecting to US 136 began in 2015 and was completed in late 2017. Another extension via SR 267 to I-65 is planned to be opened by 2020.

Route description
The roadway starts at State Road 67 at a traffic light, and is the southern terminus of Ameriplex Parkway. It heads northeast, meeting three traffic lights. It then comes to exit 68 on Interstate 70 and has a connection to the Indianapolis International Airport. At this interchange, Ameriplex Parkway ends and Ronald Reagan Parkway begins. The parkway then heads north to its northern terminus. It comes to a traffic light at Stafford Road, which connects to SR 267. It goes through one more traffic light at Metropolis Parkway, and a two-way stop intersection with Airtech Parkway. It then comes to its former northern terminus at a traffic light with US 40. From there it goes north through two more traffic lights at CR 200 S (Bradford Road), and CR 100 S (Morris Street). It then goes through traffic lights at US 36, CR 100 N (10th Street), and CR 200 N (21st Street), and then has a traffic light at CR 300 N. Then it continues North crossing CR 400N to and going over a railroad and US 136 before it comes to a stoplight at "Connector Road", which connects to US 136. continuing North, the road crosses Interstate 74 as Exit 68 and then continues north to 600N, also known as 56th st.

Major intersections

See also

References

  Ronald Reagan Corridor Master Plan

Parkways in the United States
Roads in Indiana
Transportation in Marion County, Indiana
Transportation in Hendricks County, Indiana
Transportation in Indianapolis